Gębice may refer to the following places in Poland:
Gębice, Lower Silesian Voivodeship (south-west Poland)
Gębice, Kuyavian-Pomeranian Voivodeship (north-central Poland)
Gębice, Czarnków-Trzcianka County in Greater Poland Voivodeship (west-central Poland)
Gębice, Gostyń County in Greater Poland Voivodeship (west-central Poland)
Gębice, Krosno Odrzańskie County in Lubusz Voivodeship (west Poland)
Gębice, Zielona Góra County in Lubusz Voivodeship (west Poland)